The 2022 Formula Renault Super Challenge, was a multi-event, Formula Renault open-wheel single seater motor racing championship held across Asia. 

When the series last ran in 2019, it was known as Asian Formula Renault and used Formula Renault 2.0 machinery. A switch to Formula Regional cars to align with the developments in Europe was planned, but the seasons in 2020 and 2021 were both cancelled due to the COVID-19 pandemic. 

In 2022, this switch was tried for the third time, but the once again rebranded Alpine Formula Racing Asia Series attracted no entries, so the Formula Renault Super Challenge was founded to hold races using old Formula Renault 2.0 cars again.

After six races over three rounds all held at Zhuzhou International Circuit, Gerrard Xie became champion when the fourth round was cancelled and no replacement came to be. His team, H-Star Racing, won the teams' title.

Teams and drivers

Calendar and results 
The planned calendar was revealed in April of 2022. All events were held in China. In early July, the Xiamen event was cancelled. The third event of the season was later postponed by two weeks. The season finale was then also postponed by six weeks, before eventually being cancelled entirely because of China's zero-COVID policy. It was believed a replacement event was to be organized, but those plans did not come to fruition.

Season summary 
After two years of absence owing to the COVID-19 pandemic, Formula Renault-level racing was back in Asia under the new "Formula Renault Super Challenge" guise. Nine drivers were entered into the first round of the championship, held at Zhuzhou International Circuit. The whole weekend was very rainy, and Siling Bei coped the best with the conditions. He set pole, and went on to win the first race ahead of Jacky Wong and William Kwok. His win in race one handed him pole for race two, where he repeated his efforts to claim a perfect weekend. Wong was second once again, and Kwok also repeated his podium success, this time having to fight off a charging Yat Chau Lin. Bei ended the first round with 60 points to his name, twelve points ahead of Wong.

Round two was held at the same circuit, but Bei was absent. In his place, it was debutant Gerrard Xie who set the pace all weekend. He won qualifying and kept his lead despite a bad start. He won the race ahead of Jason Wu, who also joined the championship for round two, and Nicholas Lai. Like Bei in round one, Xie then went on to also win race two. Wu was on the podium again, this time in third, despite dropping back at the start. Second was his teammate Tianhao Zhu. With his two wins matching Bei's efforts from round one, Xie and Bei now were equal on 60 points. Kenneth Ma led the standings two points ahead of the pair, despite not having a podium to his name, courtesy of his consistent finishes in all four races so far.

The third round was originally planned to be held at the newly constructed Xiamen International Circuit, but was later postponed and once again held in Zhuzhou. Xie was once again the driver to beat, comfortably setting pole position in qualifying. He was unmatched in the first race and left Wu and Brian Lai to fight over second, with Wu eventually coming out on top. Race two offered much of the same, Xie once again unchallenged on top and Wu and Lai fighting behind. This time it was Lai who was able to claim second place. Four wins out of four races saw Xie climb on top of the standings, and Wu's two podiums put him in second, 32 points behind Xie.

Issues with communication became apparent leading up to round three, with the venue change from Xiamen to Zhuzhou not being communicated to the outside world until after the event was over. These issues worsened after round three, with only secondary sources reporting of the eventual cancellation of all further events. This cancellation awarded Xie the title. While it was good to see Formula Renault competition back in Asia, the field severely lacked depth and competition, never attracting double-digit entry numbers.

Championship standings 

 Points system

Points were awarded to the top 14 classified finishers.

Drivers' Championship

Teams' Championships

References

External links 

 

Formula Renault Super Challenge
Formula Renault Super Challenge
Formula Renault Super Challenge